Vallappuzha railway station is a railway station serving the town of Shoranur in the Palakkad district of Kerala. It lies in the Shoranur–Mangalore section of the Southern Railways.  Trains halting at the station connect the town to prominent cities in India such as Nilambur, Shoranur and Angadipuram.

Nilambur–Shoranur line

This station is on a historic branch line, one of the shortest broad-gauge railway lines in India.

References

Nilambur–Shoranur railway line